The men's hammer throw at the 2022 World Athletics U20 Championships was held at Estadio Olímpico Pascual Guerrero on 2 and 4, August 2022.

Records

Results

Qualification
The qualification round took place on 2 August, in two groups, bwith Group A starting at 12:10 and Group B starting at 13:25. Athletes attaining a mark of at least 73.50 metres ( Q ) or at least the 12 best performers ( q ) qualified for the final.

Final
The final was held on 4 August at 16:48.

References

hammer throw
Hammer throw at the World Athletics U20 Championships